

Beorhtheah also (Brihtheah) (died 20 December 1038) was a medieval Bishop of Worcester.

Beorhtheah's family was a wealthy family from Worcester. He had previously been Abbot of Pershore, and was consecrated in 1033. He died on 20 December 1038.

See also
 Cyneweard of Laughern, his nephew

Citations

References

External links
 

Bishops of Worcester
1038 deaths
11th-century English Roman Catholic bishops
Year of birth unknown